Corno Grande (Italian for "great horn") is the highest point in the Apennine Mountains, situated in Abruzzo, central Italy. It is the highest peak in mainland Italy outside of the Alps, and the second highest in the entire country outside the Alps, after Mount Etna in Sicily. It has significant vertical relief on the north side, though its south side is less elevated than the adjacent Campo Imperatore plateau.

The northern corrie of Corno Grande holds one of the southernmost glaciers in Europe, the Calderone glacier. The first recorded ascent of Corno Grande was made in 1573 by the Bolognese captain Francesco De Marchi alongside Francesco Di Domenico. The usual route of ascent is via the western ridge, although a number of other routes exist, including one that ascends the southern face.

See also
 List of European ultra-prominent peaks
 List of Italian regions by highest point

References

External links 
 "Corno Grande, Italy" on Peakbagger

Mountains of Italy
Highest points of Italian regions
Mountains of the Apennines